S.M. Terry LaCorte (born March 2, 1937) is an American politician who served in the New Jersey General Assembly from the 34th Legislative District from 1980 to 1984.

References

1937 births
Living people
Republican Party members of the New Jersey General Assembly
Politicians from Passaic, New Jersey